Joe Cuba (April 22, 1931 – February 15, 2009), was an American conga drummer of Puerto Rican descent widely regarded as the "Father of Latin Boogaloo".

Early years
Joe Cuba (birth name: Gilberto Miguel Calderón) was born in Harlem, New York, United States. Cuba's parents moved from Puerto Rico to New York City in the late 1920s, and settled in Spanish Harlem, a Latino community located in Manhattan. Cuba was raised in an apartment building, where his father had become the owner of a candy store, located on the ground floor (street level floor). His father had organized a stickball club called the Young Devils. Stickball was the main sport activity of the neighborhood. After Cuba broke a leg he took up playing the conga and continued to practice with the conga between school and his free time. Eventually, he graduated from high school and joined a band.

Musical career
In 1950, when he was 19 years old, he played for Joe Panama and also for a group called La Alfarona X. The group soon disbanded and Cuba enrolled in college to study law. While at college he attended a concert in which Tito Puente performed "Abaniquito". He went up to Puente and introduced himself as a student and fan, and soon they developed what was to become a lifetime friendship. This event motivated Cuba to organize his own band. In 1954, his agent recommended that he change the band's name from the José Calderón Sextet to the Joe Cuba Sextet, and the newly named Joe Cuba Sextet made their debut at the Stardust Ballroom.

In 1962, after recording three albums for Mardi Gras Records, Cuba recorded his first album with the Joe Cuba Sextet called Steppin' Out featuring the hit "To Be With You", featuring the vocals of Cheo Feliciano and Jimmy Sabater Sr. The band became popular in the New York Latin community. The lyrics to Cuba's music used a mixture of Spanish and English, becoming an important part of the Nuyorican Movement.

In 1965, the Sextet got their first crossover hit with the Latin and soul fusion of "El Pito (I'll Never Go Back to Georgia)". The "I'll Never Go Back to Georgia" chant was taken from Dizzy Gillespie's intro to the seminal Afro-Cuban tune "Manteca." Sabater later revealed that "None of us had ever been to Georgia."

Along with fellow Nuyorican artists such as Ray Barretto and Richie Ray, Cuba was at the forefront of the developing Latin soul sound in New York, merging American R&B styles with Afro-Cuban instrumentation. Cuba was one of the key architects behind the emerging Latin boogaloo sound, which became a popular and influential Latin style in the latter half of the 1960s. In 1966, his band scored a hit on the United States Billboard Hot 100 with the song "Bang! Bang!".  The record peaked at No. 63 on the Hot 100, and No. 21 on the R&B chart.  The follow-up, "Oh Yeah", peaked at No. 62 on the Hot 100.

Later years and death
In April 1999, Joe Cuba was inducted into the International Latin Music Hall of Fame. In 2004, he was named Grand Marshal of the Puerto Rican Day Parade celebrated in Yonkers, New York. He was also the director of the Museum of La Salsa, located in Spanish Harlem, Manhattan, New York.

Joe Cuba died on February 15, 2009, in New York City, after being removed from life support. He had been hospitalized for a persistent bacterial infection. Cuba's remains were cremated at Woodhaven Cemetery. He is survived by his two adult children from his first wife (Nina, married in 1960)

Discography

As leader 

 I Tried To Dance All Night (1956)
 Mardi Gras Music For Dancing Vol. 1 (1956)
 Cha Cha Chá (1957)
 Mardi Gras Music For Dancing Vol. 2 (1958)
 Mardi Gras Music For Dancing Vol. 3 (1959)
 Brava pachanga (1959)
 Merengue loco (1961)
 Joe Cuba (1961)
 To Be With You (1962)
 Steppin' Out (1962)
 Cha Cha Chás Soothe The Savage Beast (1962)
 Diggin' The Most (1963)
 Vagabundeando (Hangin' Out) (1963)
 Comin' at You (1964)
 El Alma del Barrio: The Soul of Spanish Harlem (1964)
 Breakin' Out (1965)
 Bailadores (1965)
 Red, Hot and Cha Cha Chá (1965)
 We Must Be Doing Something Right! (1966)
 Bang Bang (1967)
 The Velvet Voice of Jimmy Sabater (1967)
 My Man Speedy (1968)
 Recuerdos de mi querido Barrio (1971)
 Bustin' Out (1972)
 Hecho y Derecho (Doing it Right) (1973)
 Cocinando la Salsa (Cookin' The Sauce) (1976)
 El Pirata del Caribe (The Caribbean Pirate) (1979)
 Steppin' Out... Again! (1995)
 Salsa y Bembé (1998)

Compilations 
Greatest Hits (2009)
El Alcalde del Barrio (2010)
The Best of Joe Cuba (Lo Mejor de Joe Cuba) - Fania Original (Remastered) (2010)
Anthology (2012)

See also
Jimmy Sabater
Boogaloo

Notes

References

External links
Living Memories of Joe Cuba

The Latin boogaloo’s history, impact and short-lived popularity are explored in the documentary We Like It Like That

1931 births
2009 deaths
Infectious disease deaths in New York (state)
American people of Puerto Rican descent
Musicians from New York City
Conga players
Salsa percussionists
20th-century American drummers
American male drummers
20th-century American male musicians
People from East Harlem